The Lower Ramu or Ottilien–Misegian languages consist of two branches in the Ramu language family. They are all spoken in Yawar Rural LLG, Madang Province, Papua New Guinea.

Classification
The Lower Ramu languages as classified by Usher and by Foley (2018) are:

Lower Ramu languages
Ottilien languages
Watam, Kaian
Gamay (Borei)
Bosmun, Awar
Misegian languages (Ruboni languages)
Mikarew (Aruamu)
Sepen, Kirei

Lower Ramu as presented in Foley (2018) has been reduced in scope from the classification given in Foley (2005), which is as follows.

Lower Ramu
Watam-Awar-Gamay (WAG) = Ottilien
Watam, Kaian
Gamay
Bosmun, Awar
Mikarew-Kire (MK) = Misegian (Ruboni)
Tangu, Igom

The Ataitan languages, including Tangu and Igom, are not included in Foley (2018).

Pronouns
Tentative proto-Lower Ramu pronoun reconstructions by Foley (2005) are:

{| 
!  !! singular !! dual !! plural
|-
! 1st person
| *ŋgu || *aŋga || *ai
|-
! 2nd person
| *nu || *(n)oŋgo(a) || *ni/e
|-
! 3rd person
| *ma(n) || *mani(ŋg) || *mV(n)
|}

Cognates
Like cognates between proto-Lower Sepik and proto-Lower Ramu listed by Foley (2005) are:

{| class="wikitable"
! gloss !! proto-Lower Sepik !! proto-Lower Ramu
|-
| tongue || *minɨŋ || *mi(m)
|-
| ear || *kwand- || *kwar
|-
| lime || *awi(r) || *awi(r)
|-
| eat || *am(b) || *am(b)
|}

References

Further reading
Paris, Brian. 2015. A Sociolinguistic Survey of the Lower Ramu Languages of Papua New Guinea. SIL Electronic Survey Reports 2015-009.

 
Ramu languages